Dara Ahmed (Assamese:দাৰা আহমেদ) was an Indian film director known for films like Rickshawala, Jakhini, Bordoisila and Pooja. He entered the Assamese Film industry as an assistant director in the film Dr Bazbarua. He died on 24 May 2021, at the age of 72 in Guwahati.

Early life 
He was born in Nazira, Sivasagar on 10 June 1946. His father A. Rashid was a doctor and his sister Eli Ahmed is a Padma shri winning writer.

Filmography

References

External links 

1946 births
2021 deaths
Assamese-language film directors
Film directors from Assam
20th-century Indian film directors
People from Sivasagar